The 2024 Indian general election in Uttar Pradesh is expected to be held in or before May 2024 to elect the members of 18th Lok Sabha.

Parties and alliances





Others

References

Indian general elections in Uttar Pradesh
Uttar Pradesh